Patrick Michael Walsh (born January 13, 1955) is a former United States Navy four-star admiral who last served as the 59th Commander of the U.S. Pacific Fleet from September 25, 2009 to January 20, 2012. He served as the 35th Vice Chief of Naval Operations from April 5, 2007 to August 13, 2009, and as Commander of the U.S. Naval Forces Central Command and Commander, U.S. 5th Fleet from October 2005 to February 27, 2007. He retired from the Navy with over 34 years of service.

Biography

Education
Walsh graduated with honors from Jesuit College Preparatory in Dallas, Texas, and was the second student in the sixty-year history of the school to receive both the Distinguished Graduate and Distinguished Alumnus awards.  He graduated from the United States Naval Academy in 1977 with a Bachelor of Science degree. He attended graduate studies in the International Relations curriculum at the Fletcher School of Law and Diplomacy, Tufts University, as part of the Admiral Arthur S. Moreau Scholarship Program. Walsh graduated first in his class and received a Master of Arts in Law and Diplomacy degree, entered the Doctorate Program with distinction and subsequently received a PhD

United States Navy career

After designation as a Naval Aviator, Walsh began operational flying with the "Golden Dragons" of Attack Squadron 192, deployed to the Indian Ocean aboard the aircraft carrier  and was later selected by Commander, Light Attack Wing Pacific, as the Junior Officer/Tailhook Pilot of the Year. He then reported to Air Test and Evaluation Squadron 5 as an Operational Test Director until selection to the Navy Flight Demonstration Squadron, "Blue Angels," where he flew the Left Wingman and Slot Pilot positions. When he returned to the fleet, Walsh joined the "Golden Warriors" of Strike-Fighter Squadron 87 as the Operations Officer and flew combat missions in support of Operations Desert Storm and Provide Comfort from the carrier .

He commanded Carrier Air Wing 1 for deployment in support of Operation Southern Watch aboard . He also commanded Carrier Group Seven of the  Strike Group for a deployment to the western Pacific Ocean. Most recently, he commanded U.S. Naval Forces Central Command and U.S. 5th Fleet, while also commanding the Combined Maritime Forces conducting Operations Enduring Freedom, Iraqi Freedom and maritime security operations in the Central Command area of responsibility.

Walsh was a Special Assistant to the Director of the Office of Management and Budget as a White House Fellow. He chaired the Department of Leadership, Ethics and Law at the U.S. Naval Academy, served as the Executive Assistant to the Chief of Naval Personnel, and reported to the Joint Staff for his first flag assignment as the Deputy Director for Strategy and Policy, (J-5). He also served concurrently as the Director, Navy Quadrennial Defense Review and Director, Navy Programming Division.

On February 3, 2009, Secretary of Defense Robert Gates selected Walsh to conduct a 30-day review of operations at the U.S. detention center at Guantanamo Bay, Cuba, following President Barack Obama's order that the detention center be closed within one year.

Awards and decorations
 Naval Aviator Badge
 Presidential Service Badge
 Office of the Joint Chiefs of Staff Identification Badge

References

1955 births
Living people
Jesuit College Preparatory School of Dallas alumni
Recipients of the Air Medal
Recipients of the Defense Superior Service Medal
Recipients of the Legion of Merit
Recipients of the Navy Distinguished Service Medal
The Fletcher School at Tufts University alumni
United States Naval Academy alumni
United States Naval Aviators
United States Navy admirals
Vice Chiefs of Naval Operations
White House Fellows
Recipients of the Meritorious Service Medal (United States)